is a railway station in Chūō-ku, Chiba, Japan, operated by the Keisei Electric Railway.

Lines
Keisei Chiba Station is served by the Keisei Chiba Line, and is 12.3 km from the terminus of the line at Keisei-Tsudanuma Station. It is also connected by escalators and a moving walkway to the Chiba Urban Monorail.

Station layout
Keisei Chiba Station has two elevated opposed side platforms with the station building underneath.

Platforms

History

The station was renamed to its present name on 1 April 1987. The Chiba Express Line (now Keisei Chihara Line) began operations from April 1992.

Station numbering was introduced to all Keisei Line stations on 17 July 2010; Keisei Chiba Station was assigned station number KS59.

Surrounding area
 Chiba Station (JR Lines and Chiba Urban Monorail)

External links

 Keisei Station layout

References

Railway stations in Japan opened in 1967
Railway stations in Chiba Prefecture